ROKS Jinju (PCC-763) was a  of the Republic of Korea Navy. She was decommissioned and gifted to Egyptian Navy, renamed ENS Shabab Misr (1000).

Development and design 

The Pohang class is a series of corvettes built by different Korean shipbuilding companies. The class consists of 24 ships and some after decommissioning are sold or given to other countries. There are five different types of designs in the class from Flight II to Flight VI.

Construction and career 
Jinju was launched on 12 February 1986 by Hyundai Heavy Industries in Ulsan. Commissioned on 1 November 1986 and decommissioned on 31 December 2016.

On 26 October 2017, the ship arrived at Alexandria Naval Base after being gifted by the Republic of Korea Navy. She was renamed ENS Shabab Misr and reclassified as 1000.

Gallery

References 

1986 ships
Ships built by Hyundai Heavy Industries Group
Pohang-class corvettes
Corvettes of the Egyptian Navy